N. Chandrasegharan (born 2 January 1955) is an Indian politician from Tamilnadu. N Chandrasegharan belongs to the All India Anna Dravida Munnetra Kazhagam party. He was elected as the Member of Parliament in 2019. Chandrasegharan belongs to the Arundathiyar community that is defined as Scheduled Casts (SC) in India.

References 

1955 births
Living people
Rajya Sabha members from Tamil Nadu
All India Anna Dravida Munnetra Kazhagam politicians